A healing lodge is a Canadian correctional institution designed to meet the needs of Aboriginal (First Nations, Métis, and Inuit) inmates. Healing lodges were created to address the concern that traditional prisons do not work on aboriginal offenders. Aboriginals are over-represented in the prison system and are also more likely to be the victims of crime. In healing lodges, the focus is on healing and reconnecting with indigenous culture while inmates serve their sentences. Connecting to nature, participating in cultural ceremonies, and learning spiritual teachings are how Healing Lodges process the rehabilitation and healing of inmates. They also have access to spiritual guidance from Elders and are encouraged to maintain connections with their families and communities. Healing lodges were proposed as an alternative for Aboriginal female offenders,  but there are now healing lodges for Aboriginal male offenders as well. Women's healing lodges are minimum/medium-security facilities, and men's healing lodges are minimum-security facilities.

History 
In 1990, a report called Creating Choices was issued by a task force aiming to improve the lives of and create more choices for federally sentenced women. One of the recommendations of the task force was the creation of a healing lodge "where Aboriginal federally sentenced women may serve all or part of their sentences". This idea was proposed by the Native Women's Association of Canada. Section 81 of the Corrections and Conditional Release Act of 1992  made it possible for Aboriginal communities and Correctional Service Canada (CSC) to work together to provide services, programs, and correctional facilities to Aboriginal inmates. Notably, it allows Aboriginal communities to provide correctional services to Aboriginal inmates.

Types of healing lodges 
There are two types of healing lodges: CSC-run healing lodges and Section 81 healing lodges. CSC-run healing lodges are funded and operated entirely by the CSC. In contrast, Section 81 healing lodges are healing lodges operating under section 81 of the Corrections and Conditional Release Act, which provides the basis for CSC to enter into agreements to operate healing lodges with Aboriginal communities. These healing lodges, unlike CSC-run healing lodges, are funded by CSC but entirely managed by Aboriginal communities or partner organizations. 

There are six Section 81 healing lodges as of 2022, located in Alberta, Manitoba, Quebec and Saskatchewan. Additionally, there are four CSC-run healing lodges in Alberta, British Columbia and Saskatchewan. Healing lodges are not available in other provinces or territories due to the lack of relevant agreements.

Success 
Healing lodges have shown signs of success. According to the Correctional Service of Canada, Aboriginals who served their sentences in a healing lodge had a re-offense rate of only 6% compared to a re-offense rate of 11% for the general population. In addition, Indigenous offenders who participated in the "Pathways" program (an Aboriginal targeted prison program) had a lower re-offense rate and were "less likely to be involved in violent incidents [with staff] and more likely to complete parole after release".

Criticisms

Accessibility and Availability

One of the major criticisms of healing lodges is that they only service a small percentage of the approximately 3,500 Aboriginals incarcerated in Canada. As of 2011, Section 81 healing lodges had a total capacity of only 68 bed spaces and CSC run healing lodges had a capacity of 194. This means that healing lodges can only accommodate 262 inmates. Furthermore, as of 2011, healing lodges were not operating at full capacity. It is possible that one of the reasons healing lodges do not operate at full capacity is the policy of only accepting minimum or low risk medium-security inmates despite the original intention for healing lodges to accept prisoners of all security levels and for prisoners to have access to these facilities from the time they were sentenced. This limits the amount of Aboriginal inmates who have access to healing lodges. For example, only 11.3% of male Aboriginal offenders were classed as minimum-security. Accepting only low-security inmates has the effect of barring the majority of the incarcerated male Aboriginal population from accessing healing lodges. According to the Office of the Correctional Investigator, "No new Section 81 facility has been added since 2001, despite a 40% increase in Aboriginal incarceration."

CSC has responded to these criticisms by stating that healing lodges are only one of several strategies in Aboriginal corrections.  "Elders and Aboriginal Liaison Officers are available in all institutions, and Aboriginal Correctional Programs, Aboriginal Community Development Officers, and Aboriginal Community Liaison Officers are in place in all regions, ensuring that offenders have support throughout their sentence, not only when they are placed in a section 81 healing lodge." The Pathways initiative (a program designed "to reinforce a traditional Aboriginal way of life through more intensive one-to-one counselling, increased ceremonial access, and an increased ability to follow a more traditional Aboriginal healing path consistent with Aboriginal traditional values and beliefs") has been established in both men's and women's institutions at all security levels.

Funding issues

Comparing to CSC-run healing lodges, funding for Section 81 healing lodges is more unstable. In 2009–2010, CSC allocated $21,555,037 for CSC lodges and $4,819,479 for section 81 lodges. This discrepancy in funding means that Section 81 lodges must pay their employees 50% less and may be unable to provide adequate training. According to the Office of the Correctional Investigator, the original intent was for CSC lodges to eventually be transferred to the control of Aboriginal communities. Presently there are no negotiations in place to transfer the control of CSC healing lodges. There is also "the perception among some Section 81 Healing Lodge staff and CSC officials that CSC-operated Healing Lodges are in competition with Section 81 Healing Lodges for minimum security inmates".

Relationship with Aboriginal Communities

Expansion of section 81 healing lodges is contingent upon acceptance by Aboriginal communities. Aboriginal communities are not always willing or able to take on the responsibility of a healing lodge. Reasons for hesitation include lack of resources and concerns for the safety of the community. Critics question the "responsibilization" of aboriginal communities and question whether the burden of rehabilitating aboriginal offenders should be placed on aboriginal communities.

In the article "When Two Worlds Collide", authors explore the contradictory way Aboriginal Communities are viewed by CSC in regards to risk assessment. Identification with aboriginal identity and involvement with the Aboriginal Community prior to incarceration are viewed as risk enhancing factors. At the same time, CSC prescribed Aboriginal programming and contact with the Aboriginal community during incarceration are seen as a risk reducing factors.

List of CSC-run healing lodges 
 Alberta
 Pê Sâkâstêw Centre, in Maskwacis (for minimum security men)
 British Columbia
 Kwìkwèxwelhp Healing Village, in Harrison Mills (for minimum security men)
 Saskatchewan
 Okimaw Ohci Healing Lodge, in Maple Creek (for minimum/medium security women)
 Willow Cree Healing Lodge, in Duck Lake (for minimum security men)

List of Section 81 Healing Lodges 
 Alberta
 Stan Daniels Healing Centre, in Edmonton (for minimum security men and offenders on conditional release)
 Buffalo Sage Wellness House, in Edmonton (for minimum/medium security women and women on conditional release)
 Manitoba
 Eagle Women's Lodge
 Ochi-chak-ko-sipi Healing Lodge in Crane River (for minimum security men)
 Quebec
 Waseskun Healing Centre, in Saint-Alphonse-Rodriguez (for minimum security men and offenders on conditional release) 
 Saskatchewan
 Prince Albert Grand Council Spiritual Healing Lodge (for minimum security men)

Further reading 
 Hayman, S. (2006). Imprisoning Our Sisters: The New Federal Women's Prisons in Canada. McGill-Queen's University Press. 
 Correctional Service Canada. (2015). An Examination of Healing Lodges for Federal Offenders in Canada. http://www.csc-scc.gc.ca/research/r130-eng.shtml#page_21

See also 
 Gladue report
 Correctional Service Canada
 Incarceration in Canada
 Waseskun, a 2016 documentary film about the Waseskun healing lodge in Quebec

References 

Prison and correctional agencies
Correctional Service of Canada